Sticks and Stones is the 77s' fourth album, released in 1990 on Broken Records.

The record is primarily a collection of previously recorded, unreleased songs.

The band's song "MT" was featured a number of times on the popular television series Beverly Hills, 90210.

Track listing
 "MT"
 "Nowhere Else"
 "This Is The Way Love Is"
 "Perfect Blues"
 "Don't, This Way"
 "You Walked In The Room"
 "The Days To Come"
 "The Loop"
 "God Sends Quails"
 "Love Without Dreams"
 "Do It For Love" (Lost Island Treasure)
 "The Lust, The Flesh, The Eyes and the Pride of Life"  (Lost Island Treasure)
 "Pearls Before Swine" (Lost Island Treasure)
 "Bottom Line" (Lost Island Treasure)

Tracks 11–14 are only available on the CD.

Personnel 

The band
 Mike Roe – guitar, lead vocals, producer
 Mark Tootle – keyboards, guitar, vocals
 Jan Eric – bass guitar, background vocals
 Aaron Smith – drums

Additional musicians 
 Chris Hillman (of The Byrds) – mandolin, bass guitar, background vocals
 Steve Griffith – bass guitar
 Mark Harmon – bass guitar
 Steve Griffith – producer, recording engineer, mixing
 Daryl Zachman – recording engineer, mixing

References 

1990 albums
The 77s albums